Asi Buzaglo (born 3 December 1982) is a former Israeli footballer.

Personal life
Asi's father is Jacob Buzaglo a former player who played in the 70's and 80's in Hapoel Tel Aviv, Beitar Jerusalem and Hapoel Jerusalem and his younger brother is Maor Buzaglo Older brother Ohad Buzaglo and younger brother Almog Buzaglo also play football.

Honours
Liga Leumit:
Runner-up (2): 2004–05, 2015–16
Toto Cup (Leumit):
Winner (1): 2004–05
Liga Alef:
Winner (1): 2014-15

References

External links
 Stats at ONE
 

1982 births
Living people
20th-century Israeli Jews
21st-century Israeli Jews
Jewish Israeli sportspeople
Israeli footballers
Hapoel Tzafririm Holon F.C. players
Hapoel Ra'anana A.F.C. players
Hapoel Haifa F.C. players
Maccabi Netanya F.C. players
Hakoah Maccabi Amidar Ramat Gan F.C. players
Hapoel Rishon LeZion F.C. players
Winners in the Survivor franchise
Hapoel Jerusalem F.C. players
Hapoel Petah Tikva F.C. players
Maccabi Ironi Amishav Petah Tikva F.C. players
Maccabi Ironi Bat Yam F.C. players
Beitar Kfar Saba F.C. players
F.C. Kafr Qasim players
Hapoel Ashkelon F.C. players
Hapoel Marmorek F.C. players
Israeli people of Moroccan-Jewish descent
Israeli Premier League players
Liga Leumit players
Footballers from Holon
Association football fullbacks
Survivor (Israeli TV series) contestants
Survivor (franchise) winners